Boris (Ber) Davydovich Brutskus (October 15/October 3 (Russian information), 1874 – December 6/December 7 (same with birthdate), 1938) was an economist from the Russian Empire.

Brutskus was born in Polangen/Palanga in Lithuania, which was then part of the Russian Empire. His brother was the historian and politician Julius Brutzkus.

Brutskus published an English translation for Economic Planning in Soviet Russia with an introduction by Friedrich Hayek in 1935.

He was forced into exile by the Bolshevik government in 1922.

He died in 1938 in Jerusalem.

Literary works 
 Экономия сельского хозяйства, народно-хозяйственные основа, 1924
 Die Lehre des Marxismus im Lichte der russischen Revolution, 1928

References

External links 
 Peoples.ru: Биография Борис Бруцкус / Boris Brutskus at www.peoples.ru (Russian)
 vgd.ru (Russian, short)
 Čajanov, Kerblay et les shestidesiatniki : une histoire globale ? at monderusse.revues.org (French)
 Iwan Iljin >> Personenverzeichnis at iljinru.tsygankov.ru (German)
 

1874 births
1938 deaths
People from Palanga
People from Courland Governorate
Lithuanian Jews
Jews from the Russian Empire
Economists from the Russian Empire
Soviet emigrants to Germany